The Hanoi Circuit or Hanoi Street Circuit (Vietnamese: Trường đua đường phố Hà Nội) was a motor racing venue located in the Nam Từ Liêm district of Hanoi, the capital of Vietnam. It was a street circuit designed to host the Vietnamese Grand Prix, a planned round of the Formula One World Championship.

History
The Hanoi Circuit was originally expected to make its debut on the Formula One calendar in 2020, but the race was cancelled in response to the COVID-19 pandemic. The planned next Formula One race on the circuit was also dropped from the 2021 calendar because of the arrest on corruption charges of a key official responsible for the race in Hanoi.

The circuit, going anticlockwise, was located next to the Mỹ Đình National Stadium and consisted of a temporary street section and a purpose-built layout that will be open to the public once completed. The purpose-built section drew inspiration from several existing circuits including the Circuit de Monaco, Suzuka Circuit, Sepang International Circuit and the Nürburgring "GP-Strecke". This philosophy of adapting corners from other circuits had previously been used in designing the layout of the Circuit of the Americas.

The original layout consisted of twenty-two corners, but this was revised in December 2019 to include an additional corner in the third sector. The extra corner was added to improve safety. Construction of the circuit was completed in February 2020.

The circuit has been abandoned since the 2020 Vietnamese Grand Prix was cancelled.

References 

Motorsport venues in Vietnam
Racing circuits designed by Hermann Tilke